This is a list of the etymology of street names in Sheffield, South Yorkshire, England.

Arundel Gate and Arundel Street – named after the Earl of Arundel
Cavendish Street – named after the Cavendish family
Church Street – after Sheffield Cathedral, which was the main parish church until 1914
Devonshire Green and Division Street – named after the Duke of Devonshire
Fitzalan Square – the Fitzalans were a branch of the Duke of Norfolk family 
Leopold Square and Leopold Street – named after Prince Leopold, Duke of Albany
Norfolk Street and Howard Street – named after the Dukes of Norfolk
Sheaf Square and Sheaf Street – after the River Sheaf
Wellington Street – named after Arthur Wellesley, 1st Duke of Wellington

References

Lists of United Kingdom placename etymology
Sheffield